Racey James McMath (born June 14, 1999) is an American football wide receiver for the Tennessee Titans of the National Football League (NFL). He played college football at LSU.

College career

McMath played college football at LSU.

Professional career

McMath was drafted by the Tennessee Titans in the sixth round, 205th overall, of the 2021 NFL Draft. He signed his four-year rookie contract with the Titans on May 17, 2021. He was placed on injured reserve on October 8, 2021. He was activated on December 11.

On August 31, 2022, McMath was placed on injured reserve. He was activated on December 10, 2022.

Personal life
Racey was born on June 14, 1999, to Pam and James McMath. His parents named him Racey because during his mother's pregnancy, he never stayed still. Pam said, "it felt like he was just racing in my stomach, so we said, 'ok, that's going to be his name – let's call him Racey.' "

References

External links
Tennessee Titans bio

1999 births
Living people
Players of American football from New Orleans
LSU Tigers football players
Tennessee Titans players
American football wide receivers